Łacha  is a village in the administrative district of Gmina Turośl, within Kolno County, Podlaskie Voivodeship, in north-eastern Poland.

The village has a population of 541.

Monuments 
 Folk sculpture of John of Nepomuk in wayside shrine

References

Villages in Kolno County